Binəqədi raion (also, Binagadi, Binagady, Binaghad, and Bonogady) is a raion in Baku, Azerbaijan. The rayon has a population of 240,800, of which 112,000 is in the municipality.  Binagadi district (former Kirov region) is located in Baku administrative area and is located 10.5 km from the city center, in the North-West of the Absheron Peninsula. Territory is 147,06 sq. M, administrative center is M. Rasulzadeh settlement.

Name
The former name of the district was the Kirov region and was named "Binagadi district" on April 29, 1992 by the decision of the National Council of the Supreme Council of the Republic of Azerbaijan.

Demographics
The number of permanent residents living in the region is 264,600 and the actual population is about 400,000.

Municipalities
The raion contains 5 municipalities: Biləcəri (settlement and village), Binagadi, Xocəsən, Rəsulzadə, 28 May (settlement district administrative districts), 4 microdistricts (6, 7, 8 and 9 micro district), 7 and 8 microdistricts, Darnagul residential area There are No 2 Administrative Area Territory (IDA) No. 2 covering the 6th and 9th micro-district borders.

There are 5 municipalities in the district, which have local self-governing bodies. Binagadi municipality covering the boundaries of the Area 1 and No. 2 and Darnagul settlement, Rasulzadeh municipality covering the boundaries of Rasulzade, Bilajari municipality covering Bilajari settlement, Binagadi settlement municipality, Binagadi settlement, Khojasan, Sulu- hill, and Khojashen municipality, which covers the boundaries of May 28.

See also
 Battle of Binagadi, 1918

References 

Districts of Baku